Kingsbury is a town in Washington Township, LaPorte County, Indiana, just northwest of the intersection of U.S. Route 35 and U.S. Route 6. The town was founded in 1835 and incorporated on March 3, 1941. During 1940 - 1941, the Kingsbury Ordnance Plant (KOP) was built for use during World War II. The plant closed after the war but reopened during the Korean War, closing permanently in 1959. The population was 242 at the 2010 census. It is included in the Michigan City, Indiana-La Porte, Indiana Metropolitan Statistical Area. The town has its own fire department, KVFD (Kingsbury Volunteer Fire Department), and a Greek revival style First Baptist church built in 1851 with its own graveyard and Winchell Cemetery.

Geography

Demographics

2000 census
As of the census of 2000, there were 229 people, 90 households, and 68 families living in the town. The racial makeup of the town was 99.56% White and 0.44% Native American.

There were 90 households, out of which 25.6% had children under the age of 18 living with them, 62.2% were married couples living together, 10.0% had a female householder with no husband present, and 24.4% were non-families. 16.7% of all households were made up of individuals, and 6.7% had someone living alone who was 65 years of age or older. The average household size was 2.54 and the average family size was 2.81.

In the town, the population was spread out, with 22.7% under the age of 18, 10.0% from 18 to 24, 29.3% from 25 to 44, 23.1% from 45 to 64, and 14.8% who were 65 years of age or older. The median age was 38 years. For every 100 females, there were 81.7 males. For every 100 females age 18 and over, there were 84.4 males.

The median income for a household in the town was $50,000, and the median income for a family was $53,438. Males had a median income of $40,417 versus $22,500 for females. The per capita income for the town was $18,096. About 4.6% of families and 9.7% of the population were below the poverty line, including 10.9% of those under the age of eighteen and none of those 65 or over.

2010 census
As of the census of 2010, there were 242 people, 91 households, and 69 families living in the town. The racial makeup of the town was 97.1% White, 0.4% African American, 0.4% Native American, and 2.1% from other races. Hispanic or Latino of any race were 5.4% of the population.

There were 91 households, of which 35.2% had children under the age of 18 living with them, 63.7% were married couples living together, 6.6% had a female householder with no husband present, 5.5% had a male householder with no wife present, and 24.2% were non-families. 19.8% of all households were made up of individuals, and 13.2% had someone living alone who was 65 years of age or older. The average household size was 2.66 and the average family size was 3.06.

The median age in the town was 39.8 years. 25.2% of residents were under the age of 18; 6.6% were between the ages of 18 and 24; 29.4% were from 25 to 44; 22.7% were from 45 to 64; and 16.1% were 65 years of age or older. The gender makeup of the town was 49.6% male and 50.4% female.

References

Towns in LaPorte County, Indiana
Towns in Indiana